Ryszard Giło (born 23 September 1949) is a Polish rower. He competed in the men's eight event at the 1972 Summer Olympics.

References

1949 births
Living people
Polish male rowers
Olympic rowers of Poland
Rowers at the 1972 Summer Olympics
Sportspeople from Szczecin